Thokozile Mndaweni (born 8 August 1981) is a South African women's footballer who plays as a goalkeeper. She plays for Croesus Ladies. She represented the South Africa women's national football team at the 2012 London Olympics She is well known for a saving a penalty and later converting her own spot kick during South Africa's win on penalties in the Olympic qualifier return leg match in Tunis in April 2011.

References

Living people
1981 births
People from Boksburg
Women's association football goalkeepers
South African women's soccer players
South Africa women's international soccer players
Footballers at the 2012 Summer Olympics
Olympic soccer players of South Africa
Sportspeople from Gauteng